Dyops is a genus of moths of the family Noctuidae. The genus was erected by Achille Guenée in 1852.

Species
Dyops chlorargyra Hampson, 1926 Venezuela
Dyops chromatophila (Walker, 1858) French Guiana
Dyops cuprescens Hampson, 1926 Peru
Dyops ditrapezium (Sepp, [1840]) Suriname
Dyops dotata (Walker, 1869) Honduras
Dyops oculigera Guenée, 1852 French Guiana
Dyops paurargyra Hampson, 1926 Brazil (Amazonas)
Dyops pupillata Felder & Rogenhofer, 1874 Suriname
Dyops schausii Dognin, 1894 Ecuador
Dyops subdifferens Schaus, 1911 Costa Rica
Dyops telharsa Schaus, 1911 Costa Rica

References

Calpinae
Moth genera